Edris Roushan Rice-Wray (January 21, 1904 in Newark, Essex County, New Jersey, United States – February 19, 1990 in San Andres Cholula, Puebla, Mexico), was a pioneer in medical research who helped to prove the worth of the oral contraceptive pill. Her work on the birth control injection pill is especially notable as medical research was influential in the creation of the birth control pill. Rice-Way headed a large scale, clinical trial of the first birth control pill in the late 1950s in Puerto Rico.

Education 
Rice-Wray attended Vassar College Degree where she specialized in public health. She also attended Cornell University where she was a member of the Alpha Phi sorority. She received the award of sesquicentennial from "knowledge, wisdom and courage of service"' at the University of Michigan in 1967.

Medical experience 
Rice-Wray worked as a doctor at Northwestern University, and had a long career working for the advancement of public health. She was a faculty member of the Puerto Rico Medical School and medical director of the Puerto Rico Family Planning Association. It was there that she headed the first large scale clinical trials working for over 17 years until the UN (United Nations) called her to work in Mexico. In 1959 she founded Mexico's first family planning clinic in Mexico City.

Clinical trials in Puerto Rico and work on the birth control pill 
In the early 1950s, Rice-Wray's work was focused on studying the effectiveness of the pill. In order to prove the safety of the pill, researchers and activists including John Rock, Margaret Sanger and Katherine McCormick felt human trials had to be conducted. During this time  Rice-Wray was working for the Puerto Rican Health Service. Puerto Rico was selected as the location for these trials in 1955 in part because there was an existing network of birth control clinics serving low-income women on the island and liberalized laws existed regarding distributing information about family planning. In 1937, a law had been passed in Puerto Rico that made it legal for married couples to receive advice about contraception. Since accessing the pill was legal, trials began there in 1956. In April 1956, Rice-Wray had been working with the Family Planning Association of Puerto Rico and joined this project. Some of the women who participated in the study experienced "the pill" (Enovid). In 1956, she starting to distribute these pills. Rice-Wray noticed early on that there were potentially problematic side effects from the dosage in the early birth control pill. Her concerns were initially dismissed by Dr. Rock and Gregory Pincus who argued those concerns raised by women were unfounded. Experiments in her studies were closely supervised by Rice-Wray and she never lost interest in finding more effective methods for controlling fertility. Rice-Wray saw a direct link between large family sizes and poverty. In 1955, she was reported as saying, "When all Puerto Rican parents can have the number of children they want and can properly care for, much of the misery and desperation of our poorer classes can be eliminated...then employment opportunities, schooling, housing, medical and welfare services will have a chance of meeting the needs of our people." Despite the controversial nature of fertility research, Rice-Wray's research was closely watched and reported on in the United States. In 1963, The New York Times reported on the details of her research as part of their coverage on a Planned Parenthood conference.

Personal life 
Rice-Wray was the daughter of Mabel and Theron Canfield Rice-Wray who were married in 1903. Originally from New York City, Rice-Way spent much of her adult life in Mexico and Puerto Rico. Faith was an important aspect of her personal life. She was one of the early followers of the Baháʼí Faith in Mexico and obtained the rights to the Spanish translation of the Baháʼí Faith book Portals of Freedom while in México.

Awards and accolades 
She received several awards for her work in publicizing the effectiveness and benefits of the pill in Latin America, she was the recipient of Planned Parenthood Federation of America's and received the Margaret Sanger Award in 1978.
She showed a long-standing commitment to public health and wellness. Gregory Pincus, who was often credited with creating the pill, would often cite the work of Rice-Wray as being instrumental to its success.

By the 1970s she moved to Puebla, in the municipality of Cholula where she worked as Professor at UDLA (University of the Americas Puebla) in the fields of Ecology, Anthropology and Population Studies, where she continues to have medical consultations helping and contributing knowledge to medicine in San Pedro Cholula and San Andrés Cholula, Puebla including contraceptive pill.

Later years 
During the last days of her life, she lived in Cholula, Puebla, Mexico, and died at her home in San Andres Cholula, accompanied by her daughters and grandchildren in 1990.

See also
Contraceptive Trials in Puerto Rico
Enovid
Oral contraceptive pill
Gregory Goodwin Pincus
Katharine McCormick
John Rock
Margaret Sanger

References

External links 
 Dr. Edris Roushan Rice-Wray Simons
 Reproduccion Following Oral Contracenpcion with Edris Rice-Wray, M.D. and Hector R. Acuna, M.D.
 Publication The Pill American Experience With Dr. Edris Rice-Wray
Edris Rice-Wray Papers, 1937-1983 (inclusive), 1960-1970 (bulk). H MS c537. Harvard Medical Library, Francis A. Countway Library of Medicine, Boston, Mass.
Edris Rice-Wray Oral History, Interviewed by Ellen Chesler and James Reed at the Sophia Smith Collection, Smith College Special Collections

1990 deaths
1904 births
American birth control activists
Cornell University alumni
American Bahá'ís
People associated with Planned Parenthood
20th-century Bahá'ís